The list of prisons in Turkey is based on official data provided by the Ministry of Justice in Turkey (as of December 2008).

Prison types

Type A

Type B, C and D

Type E and F

Type K

Type L and M

Type H and T

Closed and open prisons

Women, children and juveniles
{| class="wikitable"
| align="center" style="background:#f0f0f0;"|Name/Place
| align="center" style="background:#f0f0f0;"|Type
| align="center" style="background:#f0f0f0;"|Capacity
|-
| Karataş ||Women (closed)||144
|-
| Ankara ||Women (closed)||352
|-
| Bakırköy, Istanbul ||Women (closed)||912
|-
| Denizli ||Women (open)||350
|-
| Ankara ||Children and Juveniles||324
|-
| Maltepe, Istanbul ||Children and Juveniles||950
|-
| İncesu ||Children (closed)||60
|-
| Ankara ||Educational Centre||108
|-
| Elazığ  ||Educational Centre||120
|-
| İzmir ||Educational Centre||132
|-
! colspan=2 |Sum ||3,452
|}

Explanatory note
The lists were created using a table of the General Directorate for Penal and Arrest Centres (Adalet Bakanlığı Ceza ve Tevkifevleri Genel Müdürlüğü) as part of the Ministry of Justice in Turkey. The lists can be downloaded as an excel-file. It reflects the situation as of 1 December 2008. For the locations neither the districts nor the provinces were mentioned. In addition the General Directorate for Penal and Arrest Centres presents a total of 384 prisons (omitting prisons that have no separate administration) having a total capacity to accommodate 98,238 prisoners.

See also
 Prisons in Turkey

External links
 Website of the General Directorate for Penal and Arrest Centres (Turkish)

Prisons
Turkey